Saleh bin Awad al Maghamsi (also Saleh al-Moghamsy) (born 17 November 1963) is a sunni Islamic scholar from Saudi Arabia. He was the Imam of the Quba Mosque of Medina. He was a student of Ibn Baaz among other Islamic scholars.

Early life and education
Bin Awad al Maghamsi was born in 1963 in Al Madinah Region (Al-Madina Al-Munawara) of the Kingdom of Saudi Arabia. He grew up and was educated in the Medina region. He attended King Abdul Aziz University where he graduated in Arabic language and Islamic studies. He then studied under a number of Islamic scholars such as Mohammed Attia Salem, Abu Bakr Aljazairi, Saleh Mohammed Ibn Othaymeen, and Ibn Baaz.

Career
He became Educational Supervisor in the Arabic Language Department in the General Directorate of Education in Al-Madina Al-Munawara circa 1991. Several years later (circa 1994) he became a member of the Islamic Awareness Commission for Hajj. In 1422H (circa 2001) he was appointed as Khatib (giving Friday khutbah sermon) at King Abdul Aziz Mosque in Al-Madina Al-Munawara, and worked there for several years. In 1426H (circa 2005) he became a member of the International Commission on Scientific Signs in Quran & Sunnah. He became imam of the Mosque of Quba in Al-Madina Al-Munawara circa 2006. He was appointed as the official mufti for Saudi Arabia Television Channel 1 the next year. He became General Manager for the Center of Research and studies in Al-Madina Al-Munawara circa 2010. He was appointed lecturer at the Superior Institute of  Imams and Orators in Taibah University circa 2011. He has made many contributions and lectures on different Arabic and Gulf countries' satellite channels.

Al Maghamsi has been described as having close connections with King Salman. According to Foreign Policy magazine, 

The new Saudi king recently served as head of the supervisory board for a Medina research center directed by Maghamsi. A year after Maghamsi’s offensive comments [on Osama bin Laden], Salman sponsored and attended a large cultural festival organized by the preacher. Maghamsi also advises two of Salman’s sons, one of whom took an adoring “selfie” with the preacher last year.

Works 
Recordings of his weekly lessons of interpretation in the Quba mosque in Medina have been released in five albums under the title Reflections verses. 

Sheikh Saleh al Maghamsi has also monthly classes in Jeddah.

Website 

Al-Rasekhoon fi Al-Elm (“Steadfast in knowledge”) is the official website of Saleh Bin Awad Al Maghamsi. According to the site, its name comes from a verse of the Quran, and aims to explicate the meanings of the Quran without neglecting the Sunna.

TV programs 
 Pros of interpretation — a weekly program in the interpretation, on Al-Majd channel.
 Kattouf Dania — televised monthly meeting held every second Monday on TV channel Al-Majd
 Bahrain Complex — thirteen half-hour episode series on Al-Majd channel; recorded in three days
 Secretary place — on the Qatari channel every Wednesday
 Tafseer — on Noor Dubai channel

Views and controversy
On March 27, 2012 on Qatar Television, Al-Maghamsi stated that although "Osama bin Laden's organization" did great harm to the Muslim nation (umma) he "has more sanctity and honor than any infidel"—infidel being defined as “Jews, Christians, Zoroastrians, apostates, and atheists”. He has been accused by the conservative business newspaper Investors Business Daily of anti-semitism.

On the controversy over whether women may be allowed to reveal their faces in public, i.e. need not wear a niqāb (Sheikh Ahmad Al-Ghamdi, had created an uproar in 2014 by saying it was allowed), Al-Maghamsi said it is "always better to be modest though he admitted that not all scholars agree that women should not reveal their faces".

Al-Maghamsi has also come out in favor of "taking care of historical mosques", stating that such a practice is not unorthodox but religious and an act of worship.

See also 

 Islam in Saudi Arabia

References

External links 
  Official website

1963 births
Living people
Sunni Muslim scholars of Islam
Saudi Arabian Sunni Muslim scholars of Islam